Baby Breeze is an album by trumpeter/vocalist Chet Baker which was recorded in 1964 and released on the Limelight label.

Reception 

The Allmusic review by Ken Dryden states: "Although Chet Baker's recordings from late in his life varied dramatically in quality, this series of studio sessions is a high point in his career. After having his trumpet stolen, he plays beautifully with a borrowed flügelhorn throughout most of these songs with a powerful tone".

Track listing 
 "Baby Breeze" (Richard Carpenter) – 3:06
 "Born to Be Blue" (Mel Tormé, Robert Wells) – 4:03
 "This Is the Thing" (Hal Galper) – 4:51
 "I Wish You Love" (Charles Trénet, Albert Beach) – 3:09
 "Everything Depends on You" (Earl Hines, Charles Carpenter, Louis Dunlap) – 3:21
 "One with One" (Galper) – 3:42
 "Pamela's Passion" (Galper) – 5:19
 "The Touch of Your Lips" (Ray Noble) – 2:39
 "Comin' Down" (Richard Carpenter) – 4:25
 "You're Mine, You" (Johnny Green, Edward Heyman) – 3:08
 "Sweet Sue, Just You" (Victor Young, Will J. Harris) – 2:16 Bonus track on CD release
 "A Taste of Honey" (Bobby Scott, Ric Marlow) – 2:57 Bonus track on CD release
 "Think Beautiful" (Stan Freeman, Jack Lawrence) – 4:18 Bonus track on CD release
 "I Wish You Love" [alternate take] (Trénet, Beach) – 3:24 Bonus track on CD release
 "Think Beautiful" [alternate take] (Freeman, Lawrence) – 4:18 Bonus track on CD release
Recorded at A&R Studios in NYC on November 14, 1964 (tracks 1, 3, 6, 7, 9–12 & 14), November 20, 1964 (tracks 2, 4, 5, 8, 13 & 15)

Personnel 
 Chet Baker – flugelhorn, vocals
 Frank Strozier – alto saxophone, flute (tracks 1, 3, 6, 7 & 9) 
 Phil Urso – tenor saxophone, arranger (tracks 1, 3, 6, 7 & 9)
 Hal Galper –  piano, arranger (tracks 1, 3, 6, 7 & 9)  
 Bob James – piano (tracks 4, 8 & 13–15)
 Bobby Scott – piano, arranger (tracks 2, 5 & 12)
 Kenny Burrell – guitar (tracks 2, 5, 10 & 11)
   – bass (tracks 1, 3, 4, 6–9 & 13–15)  
 Charlie Rice – drums (tracks 1, 3, 4, 6–9 & 13–15)

References 

Chet Baker albums
1965 albums
Limelight Records albums